The 1970 NCAA University Division baseball tournament was played at the end of the 1970 NCAA University Division baseball season to determine the national champion of college baseball.  The tournament concluded with eight teams competing in the College World Series, a double-elimination tournament in its twenty-fourth year.  Eight regional districts sent representatives to the College World Series with preliminary rounds within each district serving to determine each representative.  These events would later become known as regionals.  Each district had its own format for selecting teams, resulting in 26 teams participating in the tournament at the conclusion of their regular season, and in some cases, after a conference tournament.  The twenty-fourth tournament's champion was the Southern California, coached by Rod Dedeaux.  The Most Outstanding Player was Gene Ammann of Florida State.

Tournament
The opening rounds of the tournament were played across eight district sites across the country, each consisting of between two and four teams. The winners of each District advanced to the College World Series.

Bold indicates winner.

District 1 at Hanover, NH

District 2 at Princeton, NJ

District 3 at Gastonia, NC

District 4 at Columbus, OH

District 5 at Ames, IA

District 6 at Austin, TX

District 7 at Denver, CO & Tucson, AZ

District 8 at Los Angeles

College World Series

Participants

Results

Bracket

Game results

All-Tournament Team
The following players were members of the All-Tournament Team.

Notable players
 Arizona: Leon Hooten
 Dartmouth: Pete Broberg, Chuck Seelbach
 Delaware: 
 Florida State: Ron Cash, Johnny Grubb, Pat Osburn, Mac Scarce, Stan Thomas
 Iowa State: 
 Ohio: Mike Schmidt, Steve Swisher
 Southern California: Jim Barr, Steve Busby, Dave Kingman, Eric Raich, Brent Strom
 Texas: Mike Beard, Dave Chalk, Larry Hardy, Burt Hooton

See also
 1970 NCAA College Division baseball tournament
 1970 NAIA World Series

References 

NCAA Division I Baseball Championship
1970 NCAA University Division baseball season
Baseball in Austin, Texas